Hannah Bergstedt (born 1977) is a Swedish Social Democratic Party politician.

She was elected deputy member of the Riksdag for the period 2006–2010, when she met as replacement delegate from August 2007 to March 2008, and from October 2008 to January 2009. She was elected ordinary member of the Riksdag for the period 2010–2014, and reelected for the period 2014–2018 from the constituency Norrbottens län. In the Riksdag she has been member of the Committee on Civil Affairs and the Taxation Committee.

References

1977 births
Living people
Members of the Riksdag from the Social Democrats
Women members of the Riksdag
Members of the Riksdag 2010–2014
Members of the Riksdag 2014–2018
21st-century Swedish women politicians